"Ain't It Funny" is a 2001 single by Jennifer Lopez.

Ain't It Funny may also refer to:

"Ain't It Funny" (Murder Remix), a remix of the song by Jennifer Lopez
Ain't It Funny, a 1972 album by Anthony Newley
"Ain't It Funny", a 2003 song by Soledad Brothers from Voice of Treason
"Ain't It Funny", a 1998 song by Enuff Z'Nuff from Paraphernalia
"Ain't It Funny", a 2012 song by George Jackson from The Jeb Loy Nichols Special
"Ain't It Funny", a 1975 song by Peter Goalby
"Ain't It Funny", a 1996 song by Ken Munshaw from Human Condition
"Ain't It Funny", a 1994 song by Branford Marsalis from Buckshot LeFonque
"Ain't It Funny", a 1999 song by Brainstorm
"Ain't It Funny", a 1962 song by Gerri Granger

"Ain't It Funny", a 1978 song by Colin Blunstone

"Ain't It Funny", a 2016 song by Danny Brown from Atrocity Exhibition

See also
"Ain't It Funny What a Difference Just a Few Hours Make", a Broadway song
"Funny How Time Slips Away", song by Willie Nelson